Elsa Dorlin (born ) is a French philosopher and professor in the department of political science at University of Paris 8 Vincennes/St. Dénis.

Dorlin earned her PhD in philosophy in 2004 at University of Paris 4 – Sorbonne. Her dissertation, "Au chevet de la Nation : sexe, race et médecine : XVIIe-XVIIIe siècles" was supervised by Pierre-François Moreau.

In 2005 Dorlin became an assistant professor (maîtresse de conférences) in the history of philosophy, history of sciences in the philosophy department of the University of Paris 1 Panthéon-Sorbonne. In 2009, the French National Center for Scientific Research (CRNS) awarded Dorlin the bronze medal for her work on feminist theory and philosophy of gender. In 2011 she was elected full professor and joined the political science department of Paris 8.

Dorlin's 2017 book Se défendre : une philosophie de la violence won the Frantz Fanon Book Prize from the Caribbean Philosophical Association in 2018. Verso Books is publishing an English edition.

Works
 Se défendre : une philosophie de la violence, Paris, La Découverte, 2017, 252 pages
 
 La matrice de la race : généalogie sexuelle et coloniale de la nation française, Paris, La Découverte, coll. "Textes à l'appui / Genre et sexualité", 2006, 308 p.
 L'évidence de l'égalité des sexes : une philosophie oubliée au 17e siècle, Paris, L'Harmattan, 160 p., coll. "Bibliothèque du féminisme", 2001.

References

Further reading

 Interview in Le Monde, 2010

French philosophers
Academic staff of the University of Paris
Feminist theorists
1970s births
Living people